S Voice is a discontinued intelligent personal assistant and knowledge navigator which is only available as a built-in application for the Samsung Galaxy S III, S III Mini (including NFC), S4, S4 Mini, S4 Active, S5, S5 Mini, S II Plus, Note II, Note 3, Note 4, Note 10.1, Note 8.0, Stellar, Mega, Grand, Avant, Core, Ace 3, Tab 3 7.0, Tab 3 8.0, Tab 3 10.1, Galaxy Camera, and other 2013 or later Samsung Android devices. The application uses a natural language user interface to answer questions, make recommendations, and perform actions by delegating requests to a set of Web services. S Voice is based on the Vlingo personal assistant. For Galaxy S5 and later Samsung Galaxy devices, S Voice runs on Nuance instead of Vlingo.

Some of the capabilities of S Voice include making appointments, opening apps, setting alarms, updating social network websites such as Facebook or Twitter and navigation. S Voice also offers multitasking as well as automatic activation features, for example, when the car engine is started.

In a disclaimer that pops up on first opening S Voice, Samsung states that the app is provided by a third party which it does not name.

In the Galaxy S8 and S8+, Bixby was announced to be a major update and replacement to S Voice from the prior phones. It was discontinued on 1 June 2020.

Compatible devices

Flagship smartphones and tablets

Galaxy S 
Samsung Galaxy S2 (including S2 Plus)
Samsung Galaxy S3 (including S3 Mini and S3 Neo)
Samsung Galaxy S4 (including S4 Active and S4 Mini)
Samsung Galaxy S5 (including S5 Active, S5 Mini and S5 Neo)
Samsung Galaxy S6 (including S6 Edge and S6 Edge+)
Samsung Galaxy S7 (including S7 Edge and S7 Active)

Galaxy Note 
Samsung Galaxy Note
Samsung Galaxy Note 2
Samsung Galaxy Note 3
Samsung Galaxy Note 4
Samsung Galaxy Note Edge
Samsung Galaxy Note 5
Samsung Galaxy Note 7 / FE
Samsung Galaxy Note 8.0
Samsung Galaxy Note 10.1

Mid-range smartphones and tablets

Galaxy A 
Samsung Galaxy A3 (2015, 2016 and 2017)
Samsung Galaxy A5 (2015, 2016 and 2017)
Samsung Galaxy A7 (2015, 2016 and 2017)
Samsung Galaxy A8 (2015, 2016 and 2018)
Samsung Galaxy A9 (2016) (including A9 Pro (2016))

See also 

Bixby
 Cortana
 Google Assistant
 Google Now
 Siri

References 

Mobile software
Natural language processing software
Samsung software
Virtual assistants
Computer-related introductions in 2012
Products and services discontinued in 2020